Arnab Kumar Mondal (born 25 September 1989) is an Indian professional footballer who plays as a centre back.

Career
Born in Garden Reach, a neighborhood based in Kolkata, West Bengal, Mondal joined the youth team of Mohammedan at the age of 17. In 2010, he signed for Prayag United of the I-League and played for the club for two seasons. For the 2011–12 season, Mondal created a partnership in the center of defense Bello Razaq and was also taken under the wing of India international Deepak Mondal.

During the summer of 2012, Mondal left Prayag United and joined Kolkata rivals East Bengal. He was quick to become a part of the club's history as he was a goalscorer during the club's 2012 Federation Cup Final match against Dempo. Mondal scored the equalizing goal for East Bengal in the 60th minute that lead to East Bengal winning 3–2 and the Federation Cup. Mondal soon became a mainstay for East Bengal in their backline, partnering with Uga Okpara, as East Bengal held the best defense in the I-League halfway through the campaign. However, due to an injury picked up with the national team, Mondal missed the majority of the second half of the season as East Bengal failed to win the title. Mondal came back from injury to return to East Bengal's starting line-up for the 2013–14 season. He was considered one of the club's finest players that season as he started in 18 of the club's matches that league campaign.

In July 2014, it was announced that Mondal would be among 84 Indian players who would be a part of the 2014 ISL Inaugural Domestic Draft, being available on loan from East Bengal. On 22 July 2014, he was drafted in the second round of the draft by Atlético de Kolkata. During the 2014 ISL season, Mondal helped the side reach the final against Kerala Blasters, helping his side to a 1–0 victory at the DY Patil Stadium.
In 2018-19 Arnab Mondal again decided to join ATK after suffering a bad season with East Bengal.

International
Mondal made his first start for the India U23 against Qatar U-23 in the 2012 Summer Olympics Qualifiers. Arnab was declared the captain of the senior national team for the World Cup Qualifiers against Oman on 10 June 2015 by coach Stephen Constantine.

Career statistics

Club

International

International goals
India score listed first, score column indicates score after each Fernandes goal.

Honours

East Bengal
Federation Cup: 2012–13

Atlético de Kolkata
Indian Super League: 2014, 2016

India
 SAFF Championship: 2015; runner-up: 2013

References

External links 
 Indian Super League Profile.

1989 births
Living people
Footballers from Kolkata
Indian footballers
Mohammedan SC (Kolkata) players
United SC players
East Bengal Club players
ATK (football club) players
Association football defenders
I-League players
Indian Super League players
India international footballers
India youth international footballers